Liberty dollar may refer to:

 Liberty dollar (private currency), a private currency produced in the United States
 Dollar coin (United States), various dollar coins of the United States, including:
 Flowing Hair dollar, the first dollar coin issued by the United States federal government, depicting the goddess Liberty and bearing the inscription "Liberty", minted in 1794 and 1795
 Draped Bust dollar, a United States dollar coin depicting the goddess Liberty and bearing the inscription "Liberty", minted from 1795 to 1803, and later reproduced in very limited quantities during the 1830s to 1850s bearing the date 1804
 1804 dollar, an extremely rare dollar coin of the United States depicting the goddess Liberty and bearing the inscription "Liberty", a variant of the Draped Bust dollar, minted in very limited quantities from the 1830s to 1850s
 Gobrecht dollar, a dollar coin of the United States depicting the goddess Liberty, minted from 1836 to 1839
 Seated Liberty dollar, a dollar coin of the United States depicting the goddess Liberty, minted from 1840 to 1873
 Gold dollar, a gold dollar coin of the United States depicting the goddess Liberty, minted from 1849 to 1889
 Trade dollar (United States coin), a silver trade coin of the United States depicting the goddess Liberty, minted from 1873 to 1885
 Morgan dollar, a dollar coin of the United States depicting the goddess Liberty, minted from 1878 to 1904, then again in 1921, and issued as a commemorative in 2021
 Peace dollar, a dollar coin of the United States depicting the goddess Liberty and bearing the inscription "Liberty", minted from 1921 to 1928, again in 1934 and 1935, and issued as a commemorative in 2021
 American Silver Eagle, a dollar coin of the United States depicting the goddess Liberty and bearing the inscription "Liberty", the official silver bullion coin of the United States, first produced in 1986

See also
 United States Seated Liberty coinage
 Barber coinage
 Liberty (goddess)
 Liberty coins with other face values:
 Liberty Head double eagle (a coin with a face value of 20 dollars)
 Half Eagle (a coin with a face value of two dollars)
 Walking Liberty half dollar (a coin with a face value of 0.5 dollars)
 Standing Liberty quarter (a coin with a face value of 0.25 dollars)
 Liberty Head nickel (a coin with a face value of 0.05 dollars)
 Coronet large cent (a coin with a face value of 0.01 dollars)

United States dollar coins
Dollar
Goddess of Liberty on coins
Liberty symbols